Pater Noster, or the Lord's Prayer, is a prayer in Christianity.

Pater Noster or Paternoster may also refer to:

Places
 Paternoster, Western Cape, a fishing village in South Africa
 Paternosters, uninhabitable rocks in the Bailiwick of Jersey
 Paternoster, historical name of an island in the Baltic Sea

Buildings
 Pater Noster Lighthouse, a Swedish lighthouse located in Skagerrak
 Church of the Pater Noster, a church on the Mount of Olives in Jerusalem

Other uses
 Paternoster lift, a passenger elevator which consists of a chain of open compartments that move slowly in a loop up and down inside a building
 Paternoster beads, used in Christianity to recite the psalms 
 Paternoster (surname), a surname
 Paternoster lake, one of a series of glacial lakes connected by a single stream or a braided stream system
 Paternoster Press, a British Christian publishing house

See also
 Paternoster Row, once the centre of the London publishing trade, destroyed during the Blitz, replaced by:
 Paternoster Square, an urban development in London
 Paternoster Gang, a trio of recurring fictitious characters in the British science fiction television series Doctor Who, whose headquarters was on Paternoster Row
 Paternoster cross, repositioning the letters of the Sator Square